Christian Scherübl (born April 6, 1994 in Graz) is an Austrian swimmer, who specialized in long-distance and relay freestyle events. Within a 16-year and younger age group, Scherubl set an Austrian record time of 4:05.20 in the boys' 400 m freestyle at the 2010 Geneva Long Course International Meet in Geneva, Switzerland. Scherubl is also a member of the swimming team for ATUS Graz, and is coached and trained by Christoph Schreiner.

Scherubl represented Austria at the 2012 Summer Olympics in London, where he qualified for the men's 4 × 200 m freestyle relay, along with his teammates Florian Janistyn, David Brandl, and double Olympic silver medalist Markus Rogan. Swimming the second leg, Scherubl recorded a split of 1:48.64, and the Austrian team went on to finish heat two in eighth place and sixteenth overall, for a total time of 7:17.94.

References

External links
Profile – Austrian Swimming Federation 
NBC Olympics Profile

1994 births
Living people
Olympic swimmers of Austria
Swimmers at the 2012 Summer Olympics
Austrian male freestyle swimmers
Sportspeople from Graz